Janikowski (feminine: Janikowska, plural: Janikowscy) is a Polish surname. Notable people with this name include:

 Andrzej Janikowski (1799–1864), Polish physician
 Damian Janikowski (born 1989), Polish wrestler
 Leopold Janikowski (1855–1942), Polish explorer and ethnographer
 Jerzy Janikowski (1952–2006), Polish fencer
 Sebastian Janikowski (born 1978), Polish player of American football
 Stanisław Janikowski (1891–1965), Polish diplomat

See also
Jankowski

Polish-language surnames